The 1973 Norwich Union Open was an invitational snooker tournament which took place between 24 and 29 November 1973 at the Piccadilly Hotel in London. It was open to both professionals and amateurs and featured 24 players. John Spencer won 8–7 in the final against John Pulman.

Prize fund
The breakdown of prize money for this year is shown below: 
 Winner: £1,000
 Runner-up: £500
 Third place: £300
 Fourth place: £200
 Quarter-final: £125
 Last 16: £75
 Last 24: £50
 Total: £3,500

Main draw

Eddie Charlton defeated Alex Higgins 8–5 in the third-place playoff.

References

Norwich Union Open
Norwich Union Open
Norwich Union Open